The Microsoft Lumia 532 is an entry-level smartphone developed by Microsoft Mobile that runs the Windows Phone 8.1 Operating System and is upgradable to Windows 10 Mobile operating system. 

Along with the Microsoft Lumia 435, it is believed to be based on designs from the cancelled Nokia X family.

The Microsoft Lumia 532 has been criticised for its lackluster battery power for a device in its price range.

Specifications

Hardware 

The Lumia 532 has a 4.0-inch IPS LCD display, quad-core 1.2 GHz Cortex-A7 Qualcomm Snapdragon 200 processor, 1 GB of RAM and 8 GB of internal storage that can be expanded using microSD cards up to 256 GB. The phone has a 1560 mAh Li-Ion battery, 5-megapixel rear camera and VGA front-facing camera. It is available in black, white, green and orange.

Software 

The Lumia 532 ships with Windows Phone 8.1.

See also 

Microsoft Lumia
Microsoft Lumia 435
Microsoft Lumia 535

References 

Microsoft Lumia
Mobile phones introduced in 2015
Discontinued smartphones
Windows Phone devices
Microsoft Lumia 532
Mobile phones with user-replaceable battery